Rainbow is an unincorporated community in Madison County, Alabama, United States.

History
A post office called Rainbow was established in 1901, and remained in operation until it was discontinued in 1904.

References

Unincorporated communities in Madison County, Alabama
Unincorporated communities in Alabama